DriveSavers, Inc. is a computer hardware data recovery, digital forensics and electronic discovery firm located in Novato, California. It was founded by CEO Jay Hagan and former company President Scott Gaidano in 1985.

History
In 1985, former Jasmine Technologies executives Jay Hagan and Scott Gaidano founded DriveSavers, operating from Gaidano’s condo with $1,400. DriveSavers originally offered both hard drive repair and data recovery services, but the company dropped its drive repair services within its first eight months. In 1992, DriveSavers signed an agreement with SuperMac Technology to assume technical support and warranty obligations for SuperMac Mass Storage Products.

The company merged with Data Recovery Disk Repair in 1994 and retained the DriveSavers name. In 2008, DriveSavers invested two million dollars to build a series of five ISO-certified cleanrooms to disassemble and rebuild damaged hard drives. From 2004-2009, the company grew from 35 to 85 employees.

DriveSavers also works with "the more secretive" branches of government and celebrities. In order to provide comfort and assistance to clients with a data loss situation, DriveSavers has had on staff an individual "data crisis counselor." This counselor has had experience in working for a suicide hotline.

DriveSavers is the only recovery firm licensed with every major hard-drive manufacturer, so their work on a drive does not void the warranty. It can recover data from hard disk drives, solid state drives, smart phones, servers, digital camera media and iOS devices. The company can recover data from T2 and M1-powered Macs with embedded SSD storage. Even with cloud backup, personal data loss is still possible, but can be recovered. The company recovered data from old floppy disks of the deceased creator of Star Trek, Gene Roddenberry, potentially containing lost episodes of the franchise.

DriveSavers is certified HIPAA-compliant, undergoes annual SOC2 Type II reviews and has encryption training certificates from GuardianEdge, PGP, PointSec and Utimaco.

Security certifications and practices

DriveSavers facility is made up of cleanrooms. The cleanrooms come in different ratings depending on the application and range from federal standards of 100,000 to 100. The rating is a measure of the number of 0.1-micron-sized airborne particulates per square meter. 

DriveSavers employees have to go through background checks, because of contracts with state, and federal government agencies. The company also has to meet data-security standards its clients do, like HIPAA certification to work with hospitals and GLBA certification to work with financial institutions.

Awards
 Diamond Certified, since 2013– cert 2035
 Storage Visions, Visionary Company Award, 2014
 Flash Memory Summit, Most Innovative Flash Memory Consumer Application Award, 2018
 Better Business Bureau, A+ rating

See also 
List of data recovery companies

References

External links
 Official site

Computer forensics
Data recovery companies
American companies established in 1985
Novato, California
Companies based in Marin County, California